Za or ZA may refer to:

Business
 Za (guilds), former Japanese feudal trade guilds; also a Japanese term (座), usually meaning "seat" or "platform"
 ZoneAlarm, an internet security software company
 ZA, IATA airline code for Interavia Airlines
 Zest Airways, a defunct airline in the Philippines

Country codes
 ZA (from Dutch Zuid-Afrika), ISO 3166 country code for South Africa
 ZA, FIPS 10-4 country code for Zambia

Language
 Za (Armenian letter) (Զ զ), the sixth letter of the Armenian alphabet
 Za (cuneiform), a sign of the ancient Near Eastern cuneiform script
 Ẓāʼ (ظ), the penultimate and rarest modern Arabic letter 
 Zhuang languages, spoken in southern China (ISO 639-1: za)

Science and technology
 .za, South Africa's Internet top-level domain
 Zeptoampere (zA), SI unit of electric current, equal to 10−21 amperes
 Zettampere (ZA), SI unit of electric current, equal to 1021 amperes
 Zinc aluminium (ZA), a family of metal alloys

Other uses
 "Za", a song by Supergrass from their 2002 album Life on Other Planets
 Za, American slang for pizza
 Za (plant), the common name in Malagasy for Adansonia za

See also
 
 
Za Za Za, album by Grupo Climax
Za-Za album by BulletBoys